Marcel Gaston Charles Frébourg (2 March 1892 – 2 March 1950) was a French coxswain.

Frébourg competed at the 1906 Intercalated Games in Athens with the men's coxed four where they won silver. In the men's coxed pair (1 km) he won a bronze medal. In the 1 mile event for coxed pairs, he finished outside of the medals. At the 1906 European Rowing Championships, he won a silver medal with the men's eight.

References

1892 births
1950 deaths
French male rowers
Olympic rowers of France
Rowers at the 1906 Intercalated Games
People from Levallois-Perret
Coxswains (rowing)
Sportspeople from Hauts-de-Seine
European Rowing Championships medalists